Anne Gwynne (born Marguerite Gwynne Trice; December 10, 1918 – March 31, 2003) was an American actress who was known as one of the first scream queens because of her numerous appearances in horror films. Gwynne was also one of the most popular pin-ups of World War II. Shs the maternal grandmother of actor Chris Pine.

Early life 
Gwynne was born in Waco, Texas, the daughter of Pearl (née Guinn) and Jefferson Benjamin Trice, an apparel manufacturer. She had a brother Jefferson Jr. (b. 1914). After her family moved to St. Louis, Missouri, she attended Stephens College, where she studied drama.

Career 

While accompanying her father to a convention in Los Angeles, Gwynne obtained a job modeling for Catalina Swimwear. She soon began acting in small theaters and appeared in a newsreel and a charity short. In June 1939, she signed a contract with Universal and was immediately put to work in Unexpected Father.

Universal cast her in a variety of genres including film noir and musical comedy. She co-starred with Buster Crabbe and Carol Hughes in Flash Gordon Conquers The Universe, a 12 episode Universal serial (1940). Gwynne  made a number of Westerns at the studio, including two she numbered among her favorite projects; Men of Texas with Robert Stack and Broderick Crawford and Ride 'Em Cowboy with Abbott and Costello (both 1942). She is remembered by fans of horror for her work in several pictures made in the 1940s. Her first horror film was Black Friday (1940) in which she played Boris Karloff's daughter. House of Frankenstein (1944) was the last horror picture she did at Universal.

Gwynne was a television pioneer, appearing in TV's first filmed series, Public Prosecutor (1947–48); she was a member of the regular cast, playing Pat Kelly, the district attorney's secretary.

Personal life 
Gwynne married Max M. Gilford in 1945. The couple had two children: Gregory, a recording artist on Dunhill Records; and Gwynne, an actress. Gwynne Gilford and her husband, actor Robert Pine, have two children, actors Katherine and Chris Pine. 

Gwynne was a Democrat and endorsed Adlai Stevenson for president in the 1952 presidential election.

Death 
Anne Gwynne died March 31, 2003, of a stroke following surgery at the Motion Picture Country Hospital in Woodland Hills, California. She was cremated, and her ashes were scattered at sea.

Partial filmography 

Unexpected Father (1939) – Kitty – showgirl
Oklahoma Frontier (1939) – Janet Rankin
Little Accident (1939) – Blonde Girl (uncredited)
Man from Montreal (1939) – Doris Blair
The Big Guy (1939) – Joan's Friend (uncredited)
Charlie McCarthy, Detective (1939) – Miss Larkin, Charlie's Nurse (uncredited)
The Green Hornet (1940, Serial) – Josephine Weaver [Ch. 3] (uncredited)
Honeymoon Deferred (1940) – Cecile Blades
Framed (1940) – Girl (uncredited)
Black Friday (1940) – Jean Sovac
It's a Date (1940) – Society Girl (uncredited)
Flash Gordon Conquers the Universe (1940, Serial) – Sonja [Chs. 2, 6-12]
Sandy Is a Lady (1940) – Millie
Bad Man from Red Butte (1940) – Tibby Mason
Spring Parade (1940) – Jenny
Give Us Wings (1940) – Julie Mason
Nice Girl? (1941) – Sylvia Dana
Washington Melodrama (1941) – Mary Morgan
The Black Cat (1941) – Elaine Winslow
Tight Shoes (1941) – Ruth
Mob Town (1941) – Marion Barker
Melody Lane (1941) – Patricia Reynolds
Road Agent (1941) – Patricia Leavitt
Keeping Fit (1942) – Nurse
Don't Get Personal (1942) – Susan Blair
Jail House Blues (1942) – Doris Daniels
Ride 'Em Cowboy (1942) – Anne Shaw
Broadway (1942) – Pearl
The Strange Case of Doctor Rx (1942) – Kit Logan Church
You're Telling Me (1942) – Kit Bellamy
Men of Texas (1942) – Jane Baxter Scott
Sin Town (1942) – Laura Kirby
We've Never Been Licked (1943) – Nina Lambert
Frontier Badmen (1943) – Chris Prentice
Top Man (1943) – Pat Warren
Ladies Courageous (1944) – Gerry Vail
Weird Woman (1944) – Paula Reed
Moon Over Las Vegas (1944) – Marion Corbett
South of Dixie (1944) – Dixie Holister
Babes on Swing Street (1944) – Frances Carlyle
Murder in the Blue Room (1944) – Nan
House of Frankenstein (1944) – Rita Hussman
I Ring Doorbells (1946) – Brooke Peters
Fear (1946) – Eileen Stevens / Cathy Stevens
The Glass Alibi (1946) – Belle Martin
The Ghost Goes Wild (1947) – Phyllis Beecher
Killer Dill (1947) – Judy Parker
Dick Tracy Meets Gruesome (1947) – Tess Trueheart
Panhandle (1948) – June O'Carroll
The Enchanted Valley (1948) – Midge Gray
Arson, Inc. (1949) – Jane Jennings
The Blazing Sun (1950) – Kitty
Call of the Klondike (1950) – Nancy Craig
King of the Bullwhip (1950) – Jane Kerrigan
Breakdown (1952) – Candy Allen
Teenage Monster (1958) – Ruth Cannon
Adam at 6 A.M. (1970) – Mrs. Gaines (final film role)

References

External links 

1918 births
2003 deaths
20th-century American actresses
Actresses from Waco, Texas
Female models from Texas
American film actresses
American television actresses
California Democrats
Texas Democrats
Universal Pictures contract players
21st-century American women
Pine family